the 1843 Chicago mayoral election , Democratic nominee Augustus Garrett defeated Whig nominee Thomas Church and Liberty nominee Henry Smith by a landslide 26.5% margin.

Incumbent Whig Benjamin Wright Raymond did not run for reelection to a third term.

Democratic nominee Augustus Garrett had been an unsuccessful election in the preceding 1842 election. He was also a former city alderman.

Like Garrett, Liberty candidate Henry Smith had also been a candidate in the previous election.

As with other mayoral elections of the era, returns in the city's wards heavily matched the partisan makeup of the votes that had been cast in the city's aldermanic election.

Results

References

Mayoral elections in Chicago
Chicago
Chicago
1840s in Chicago